Indonesia participated in the 2013 Asian Indoor and Martial Arts Games in Incheon, South Korea on 29 June – 6 July 2013.

Indonesia sent 76 athletes which will compete in 6 sports.

Medal summary

Medals table

Medalists

References

External links 

Asian Indoor and Martial Arts Games
Asian Indoor and Martial Arts Games 2013
Indonesia
2013